Stanisław Broniewski alias Stefan Orsza, Witold, K. Krzemień (29 December 1915 – 30 December 2000) was a Polish economist, Chief Scouts of the Gray Ranks and Second lieutenant of the Home Army during the World War II.

Biography 
During Siege of Warsaw in September 1939, he co-organized the Scouts Emergency. During the German occupation Poland in the Gray Ranks. Commander of the Operation Arsenal. Participant of the Warsaw Uprising. Then, after his fall, a prisoner of the Bergen-Belsen concentration camp. From 1945, he was the commander of Scouts among Poles in Germany.

After war, he returned to the country in 1946. From 1946 to 1948 he was the deputy director of the Department at the Central Planning Office. Later he was employed as an official in Społem. In December 1956 he took part in the ZHP Congress in Łódź. He then joined the Supreme Scout Council of Polish Scouting and Guiding Association (ZHP), in which he remained until 1958. Together with a group of Catholic activists, he intended to run for the Sejm in the 1957 legislative elections, but his name was deleted by the communist authorities.

He defended his Doctor of Philosophy and did a Habilitation in urban economics. In 1966 he became an assistant professor at the University of Łódź.

Awards
 Knight of the Order of the White Eagle (1995)
 Silver Cross of Virtuti Militari
Gold Cross of Merit (1973)
Silver Cross of Merit with Swords
Warsaw Uprising Cross
Army Medal for War 1939-45
Home Army Cross
Partisan Cross
Cross of Merit (Polish Scouting and Guiding Association)
Honorary Citizen of Warsaw
Honorary Citizen of Poznań

References

1915 births
2000 deaths
Military personnel from Warsaw
20th-century Polish economists
Polish Scouts and Guides
Polish Army officers
Recipients of the Silver Cross of the Virtuti Militari
Home Army members
Recipients of the Order of the White Eagle (Poland)